Hong Kong Property Services (Agency) Limited (HKPS) is one of the largest real estate brokerage companies in Hong Kong. It was established in 1986. It was acquired by Cheung Kong Holdings in 1996, but sold to Midland Holdings in 2000. It also establishes a subsidiary in Shenzhen to operate its real estate property agent business in Mainland China.

References

External links
 

Real estate companies established in 1986
Property agencies of Hong Kong
1986 establishments in Hong Kong